William Thomas Petty-FitzMaurice, Earl of Kerry (30 March 1811 – 21 August 1836), styled Earl of Wycombe between 1811 and 1818, was a British Whig politician.

Background
Kerry was born at Lansdowne House, London, the eldest son of Henry Petty-Fitzmaurice, 3rd Marquess of Lansdowne, and Lady Louisa Emma, daughter of Henry Fox-Strangways, 2nd Earl of Ilchester.

Political career
Kerry was returned to Parliament for Calne in 1832, a seat he held until his early death four years later.

Family
Lord Kerry married Lady Augusta Lavinia Priscilla, daughter of John Ponsonby, 4th Earl of Bessborough, in 1834. They had one daughter, Mary, who married Percy Egerton Herbert. Lord Kerry died at Lansdowne House, London, in August 1836, aged 25. His younger brother Henry later succeeded in the marquessate. Lady Kerry later remarried and died in November 1904, aged 90.

Recent tentative research has revealed that Catherine, Duchess of Cambridge, (Kate Middleton), might be a collateral descendant of  Prime Minister, William Petty, 1st Marquess of Lansdowne (1737-1805), who is the grandfather of Lord Kerry. The connection might be through Lady Bullock, née Barbara May Lupton (1891-1974) who is the Duchess'  second cousin, thrice removed.

References

External links 
 

1811 births
1836 deaths
Courtesy earls
Heirs apparent who never acceded
William
Members of the Parliament of the United Kingdom for constituencies in Cornwall
UK MPs 1832–1835
UK MPs 1835–1837
Committee members of the Society for the Diffusion of Useful Knowledge